The Elmira Junior Jackals joined as the 21st member team of the Empire Junior Hockey League. Former Elmira College Division III coach Glenn Thomaris will serve as head coach. The Elmira Junior Jackals play at the First Arena in Elmira, NY the home Elmira Jackals of the ECHL, an affiliate with the Ottawa Senators of the NHL. The Jr. Jackals play in the American Conference in the West Division of the Empire Jr. Hockey League.

Regular season records

2008-2009 Team Roster
4  	Turkasz, Alex 	D 	5-9 	165 	Jul 25, 1992 	Corning, NY
5 	Spencer, Tyler 	D 	5-10 	160 	Dec 01, 1990 	Elmira, NY
6 	Walker, Alex 	F 	5-10 	153 	May 1, 1992 	Corning, NY
7 	[Clewlow, John] 	F 	Started Season on Elmira College D3 Team
8 	Brown, Thomas 	D 	5-6 	167 	May 19, 1991 	Elmira, NY
9 	Burke, Kevin 	D 	6-1 	185 	May 2, 1991 	Elmira, NY
10 	Lamoreax, Joseph 	F 	5-7 	135 	Jul 12, 1992 	Elmira, NY
11 	Mitchell, Drew 	F 	6-1 	160 	Sep 02, 1990 	Elmira, NY
12 	Ray, Sean 	D 	6-1 	185 	Dec 17, 1988 	Corning, NY
14 	OMalley, Anthony 	F 	6-1 	180 	Nov 14, 1991 	Binghamton, NY
15 	Sincock, John 	F 				
17 	Davenport, Jake 	D 	5-8 	170 	Apr 12, 1993 	Elmira, NY
20 	OBrien, Justin 	F 	5-9 	175 	Jul 11, 1991 	Elmira, NY
21 	Kurzejewski, Matt 	F 	5-11 	185 	Jun 27, 1991 	Mansfield, PA
22 	Farrell, Zachary 	D 				
25 	Kasel, Mike 	F 	6-1 	170 	May 19, 1989 	Ithaca, NY
26 	Murray, Matt 	F 	5-11 	140 	Dec 05, 1990 	Horseheads, NY
27 	Edwards, Daniel 	F 	5-5 	160 	Jul 05, 1993 	Elmira, NY
28 	Thomaris, Bobby 	F 	5-11 	155 	Oct 27, 1990 	Elmira, NY
32 	Kendall-Jacobs, Cody 	G 	5-8 	160 	Jan 20, 1991 	Ithaca, NY
33      [Glaser, Max] 	        G 	6-1 	142 	Oct 30, 1990 	Agoura Hills, Ca
38 	Anderson, Seth 	G 			Oct 27, 1990 	Buffalo, New York
39 	Daum, Johnny 	G 	5-8 	143 	Mar 30, 1993 	Horseheads, NY
44 	[Long, Shane] 	D 	6-0 	150 	Apr 07, 1990 	North Carolina
66      Kalweit, Christian      F       5-9     167     Sep 30, 1991    Elmira, NY

53 	Grippin, Ross 	F 	5-8 	157 	Dec 17, 1990 	Ithaca, NY
71 	Rominger, Sean 	D

Game notes
With the first win only hours past the Junior Jackals again faced off against the NY Coyotes only this time they knew what it felt like to win so they worked hard and again came out on top with a 4-1 victory. Anthony O'Malley was first to score for the Jackals on a power play pass from Drew Mitchell and Mike Kasel. Goal two was a shorthanded goal by Bobby Thomaris from Kevin Burke and Shane Long. Alex Walker scored goal number 3 on the powerplay from Ross Grippin. Jake Davenport put goal number 4 into the net from a powerplay pass by Mike Kasel. Max Glaser was strong in the net with 40 saves, allowing only one goal." It was a battle out there, and I am sure glad we won!" stated all-star forward John Brown.

External links
Elmira Jr. Jackals Website
Empire Junior Hockey League

References

Ice hockey teams in New York (state)